Park Town or Parktown may refer to:

 Park Town, Luton, Bedfordshire, England
 Park Town, Chennai, India
 Park Town (State Assembly Constituency), India
 Park Town, Oxford, Oxfordshire, England
 Parktown, a suburb of Johannesburg
 HMSAS Parktown, two ships of the South African navy

See also
 Park Township (disambiguation)